Forelius nigriventris is a species of ant in the genus Forelius. Described by Forel in 1912, the species is endemic to South America.

References

External links

Dolichoderinae
Hymenoptera of South America
Insects described in 1912